Following the definition that a civilian is someone who is not part of their country's armed forces, there have been a total of 24 fully civilian crewed orbital space missions, listed below:

List

See also
List of Soyuz missions
List of human spaceflights
List of fully civilian crewed suborbital spaceflights

References

fully civilian
2000s in spaceflight
2010s in spaceflight
2020s in spaceflight